Association Sportive de Djerba (often referred to as ASD) is a football club based in Houmet Es'Souk, Djerba in Tunisia. Founded in 1946 when Jilani Anane was its first president, the team plays in white and green colors. Their ground is Stade Houmet Es'Souk, which has a capacity of 12,000.

Managers
 Abdelhay Ben Soltane (5 Aug 2014–)

External links
   asdjerba.oldiblog.com
  asdjerba.e-monsite.com

Football clubs in Tunisia
Association football clubs established in 1946
1946 establishments in Tunisia
Djerba
Sports clubs in Tunisia